The Copenhagen tram system was a tramway network in service from 22 October 1863 - 22 April 1972 in and around Copenhagen, Denmark. The first lines were horse-drawn trams which were replaced in the 1880s by steam-powered tramways. In the 1890s electrical trams were introduced. The trams were operated by a number of private companies until 1911 when the city took over the operation of most of the system, followed by a full take-over some years later.

The system was closed on April 22, 1972 at a time when streetcar systems across Europe and North America were being closed because they were not seen as a modern transportation solution and they were largely replaced by buses and private cars. Copenhagen also had an expanding commuter rail service, the S-train, which had expanded greatly over the preceding decades.

Teddy Østerlin Koch has since argued that the removal of the trams was a mistake, as modernised trams were more economical than reported in the city's evaluations of the time, and that an updated tram system would have been cheaper, more timely, better for the environment, and more effective at transporting large volumes of passengers than the solutions eventually implemented: building a Copenhagen metro (opened 30 years after closure of tram system) and expanding the bus network.

Future developments
After a 40-year absence, plans are now underway to build a new light rail line in Copenhagen between Lundtofte and Ishøj, scheduled for completion by 2025.

See also

 Transport in Copenhagen
 History of trams
 Kjøbenhavns Sporvei-Selskab

References

External links

Danish tram museum
Tram Travels: Københavns Sporveje (KS)

Rail transport in Copenhagen
Tram transport in Denmark
Copenhagen